Alexander Peya and Bruno Soares were the defending champions, but Soares chose not to participate this year. Peya played alongside Julian Knowle, but lost in the semifinals to Juan Sebastián Cabal and Robert Farah.
Henri Kontinen and John Peers won the title, defeating Cabal and Farah in the final, 6–3, 3–6, [10–7].

Seeds

Draw

Draw

References
 Main Draw

Doubles